McKay Reserve is a small tract of remnant urban bushland in Palm Beach, parts of which contain the endangered ecological community (EEC) Pittwater and Wagstaffe Spotted Gum Forest. The reserve lies on a ridge on the Barrenjoey Peninsula and overlooks western Pittwater.

Mapping by the NSW Office of Environment and Heritage in 2013 shows the reserve as also containing Coastal escarpment littoral rainforest, a particular subgroup of the Littoral Rainforest community, which is also an endangered ecological community.

Flora species list
The flora species list is taken from Smith & Smith (1992). Species from other lists are referenced individually.  Species introduced from overseas are prefixed with an asterisk (*), non-local Australian species with #. Of the 362 plant species listed by Smith & Smith, 125 (approximately one third) are naturalised introduced species.

References

Endangered ecological communities
Remnant urban bushland
Nature reserves in New South Wales
Northern Beaches